Edward Francis may refer to:

Edward Howel Francis (1924–2014), geologist
Edward Francis, bacteriologist involved in the discovery of Francisella
Edward Francis (MP), MP for Steyning
Ed Francis (1926–2016), wrestler
Eddie Francis (born 1974), Canadian politician
Edward Francis (bishop) (1930–2017), Bishop of Sivagangai 1987–2005
Edward Francis (priest) (1929–2004), Archdeacon of Bromley
Edward Carey Francis (1897–1966), mathematician and Kenyan educator
Edward Francis (footballer) (born 1999), English footballer

See also

Francis (surname)